The Selby Opera House, at 3409 Main St. in Selby, South Dakota is a Classical Revival building built in 1909.  It was listed on the National Register of Historic Places in 1987.

It is a two-story building on a masonry basement, chiefly a two-story auditorium.

It was deemed significant for having "over seventy-five years served as the primary entertainment facility in Selby and the surrounding community."

References

Theatres on the National Register of Historic Places in South Dakota
Neoclassical architecture in South Dakota
Cultural infrastructure completed in 1909
Walworth County, South Dakota
1909 establishments in South Dakota